The 2014–15 Liga Femenina de Baloncesto is the 52nd edition of the Spanish premier women's basketball championship. Regular season started on 15 October 2014 and finished on 28 March. Championship playoff will begin on 4 April with Semifinal matches.

Competition format
The 14 teams play each other on a round robin format. The three qualified teams after the first half of the season and the host one will play the Copa de la Reina. If the host team finishes in the top three, the fourth qualified will join the competition.

After the Regular Season, the top four teams play the play-offs, featuring semi-finals and Finals on a best-of-3 series. The two bottom teams will be relegated to Liga Femenina 2

The League champion, Cup champion and first team after the Regular Season have a guaranteed spot in FIBA Europe competitions for the 2015-2016.

2014–15 season teams 
The competition was expanded from 12 to 14 clubs. At the end of season 2013-2014, GDKO Bizkaia was relegated and CB Ciudad de Burgos disbanded. Gernika Bizkaia, as Liga Femenina 2 champion, together with CB Al-Qazeres Extremadora (2nd), Campus Promete (4th) and Universitario Ferrol (5th) were promoted.

League table

Playoffs

Semifinals

(1) Perfumerías Avenida vs. (4) Cadí La Seu

(2) Spar Citylift Girona vs. (3) Conquero Huelva Wagen

Final

(1) Perfumerías Avenida vs. (2) Spar Citylift Girona

Positions by round
The table lists the positions of teams after completion of each round.

Last updated: 16 Mar 2015, after Round 22* Standings after Round 13 determine the qualified teams for the Copa de la Reina.On November 14, the Spanish Basketball Federation awarded the organization of the Cup to the city of Torrejón de Ardoz, qualifying Rivas Ecópolis as host team.
(Q) marks the Round when the team qualified mathematically for the playoffs.

Stats leaders in regular season

Points

Rebounds

Assists

Performance Index Rating

References

External links
Liga Femenina website
Spanish Basketball Federation website

Liga Femenina de Baloncesto seasons
Femenina
Spain
Liga